Selenicë Stadium is a multi-use stadium in Selenicë, Albania. It was primarily used by local side KS Selenicë when the club was active, but since the 1990s, it has not been used regularly and has become run down.

References

Football venues in Albania
Multi-purpose stadiums in Albania
Buildings and structures in Selenicë